A urethral stricture is a narrowing of the urethra, the tube connected to the bladder that allows the passing of urine. The narrowing reduces the flow of urine and makes it more difficult or even painful to empty the bladder.

Urethral stricture is caused by injury, instrumentation, infection, and certain non-infectious forms of urethritis The condition is more common in men due to their longer urethra.

Signs and symptoms 

The hallmark sign of urethral stricture is a weak urinary stream. Other symptoms include:
 Splaying of the urinary stream
 Urinary frequency
 Urinary urgency
 Straining to urinate
 Pain during urination
 Urinary tract infection
 Prostatitis
 Inability to completely empty the bladder.

Some people with severe urethral strictures are completely unable to urinate. This is referred to as acute urinary retention, and is a medical emergency. Hydronephrosis and kidney failure may also occur.

Complications 

 Urinary retention
 Prostatitis
 Bladder dysfunction
 Urethral diverticulum
 Periurethral abscess
 Fournier's gangrene
 Urethral fistula
 Bilateral hydronephrosis
 Urinary infections
 Urinary calculus

Causes 

Urethral strictures most commonly result from injury, urethral instrumentation, infection, non-infectious inflammatory conditions of the urethra, and after prior hypospadias surgery. Less common causes include congenital urethral strictures and those resulting from malignancy.

Urethral strictures after blunt trauma can generally be divided into two sub-types;
 Pelvic fracture-associated urethral disruption occurs in as many as 15% of severe pelvic fractures. These injuries are typically managed with suprapubic tube placement and delayed urethroplasty 3 months later. Early endoscopic realignment may be used in select cases instead of a suprapubic tube, but these patients should be monitored closely as vast majority of them will require urethroplasty.
 Blunt trauma to the perineum compresses the bulbar urethra against the pubic symphysis, causing a "crush" injury. These patients are typically treated with suprapubic tube and delayed urethroplasty.

Other specific causes of urethral stricture include:
 Instrumentation (e.g., after transurethral resection of prostate, transurethral resection of bladder tumor, or endoscopic kidney surgery)
 Infection (typically with Gonorrhea)
 Lichen sclerosus
 Surgery to address hypospadias can result in a delayed urethral stricture, even decades after the original surgery.

Diagnosis 
Among ways to diagnose this condition is:

 Cystoscopy
 Urethrography

Treatment 
Initial treatment usually involves urethral dilation (widening the tube) or urethrotomy, where the stricture is cut away with a cystoscope.

Dilation and urethrotomy 

Urethral dilation and other endoscopic approaches such as direct vision internal urethrotomy (DVIU), laser urethrotomy, and self intermittent dilation are the most commonly used treatments for urethral stricture. However, these approaches are associated with low success rates and may worsen the stricture, making future attempts to surgically repair the urethra more difficult.

A Cochrane review found that performing intermittent self-dilatation may confer a reduced risk of recurrent urethral stricture after endoscopic treatment, but the evidence is weak.

Urethroplasty 

Urethroplasty refers to any open reconstruction of the urethra. Success rates range from 85% to 95% and depend on a variety of clinical factors, such as stricture as the cause, length, location, and caliber. Urethroplasty can be performed safely on men of all ages.

In the posterior urethra, anastomotic urethroplasty (with or without preservation of bulbar arteries) is typically performed after removing scar tissue.

In the bulbar urethra, the most common types of urethroplasty are anastomotic (with or without preservation of corpus spongiosum and bulbar arteries) and substitution with buccal mucosa graft, full-thickness skin graft, or split thickness skin graft. These are nearly always done in a single setting (or stage).

In the penile urethra, anastomotic urethroplasties are rare because they can lead to chordee (penile curvature due to a shortened urethra). Instead, most penile urethroplasties are substitution procedures utilizing buccal mucosa graft, full-thickness skin graft, or split-thickness skin graft. These can be done in one or more settings, depending on stricture location, severity, cause and patient or surgeon preference.

Urethral stent 

A permanent urethral stent was approved for use in men with bulbar urethral strictures in 1996, but was recently removed from the market.

A temporary thermoexpandable urethral stent (Memotherm) is available in Europe but is not currently approved for use in the United States.

Emergency treatment 

When in acute urinary retention, treatment of the urethral stricture or diversion is an emergency. Options include:
 Urethral dilatation and catheter placement. This can be performed in the Emergency Department, a practitioner's office or an operating room. The advantage of this approach is that the urethra may remain patent for a period of time after the dilation, though long-term success rates are low.
 Insertion of a suprapubic catheter with catheter drainage system.  This procedure is performed in an Operating Room, Emergency Department or practitioner's office. The advantage of this approach is that it does not disrupt the scar and interfere with future definitive surgery.

Ongoing care 

Following urethroplasty, patients should be monitored for a minimum of 1 year, since the vast majority of recurrences occur within 1 year.

Because of the high rate of recurrence following dilation and other endoscopic approaches, the provider must maintain a high index of suspicion for recurrence when the patient presents with obstructive voiding symptoms or urinary tract infection.

Research

Urethrotomy vs. urethroplasty 
Comparing the two surgical procedures, a UK trial found that both urethrotomy and urethroplasty are effective in treating urethral narrowing in the bulbar region. At the same time the more invasive urethroplasty had longer-lasting benefit and was associated with fewer re-interventions. The results were integrated into the new UK guidelines on the treatment urethral narrowing by British Association of Urological Surgeons.

Bioengineering 
The use of bioengineered urethral tissue is promising, but still in the early stages. The Wake Forest Institute of Regenerative Medicine has pioneered the first bioengineered human urethra and in 2006 implanted urethral tissue grown on bioabsorbable scaffolding (approximating the size and shape of the affected areas) in five young (human) males who had congenital defects, physical trauma, or an unspecified disorder necessitating urethral reconstruction. As of March, 2011, all five recipients report the transplants have functioned well.

Cell therapy approach through endoscopy 

Buccal mucosal tissue harvested under local anesthesia after culturing in the lab when applied through endoscopy after urethrotomy in a pilot study has yielded encouraging results. This method named as BEES-HAUS procedure needs to be validated through a larger multicentric study before becoming a routine application.

References

External links 

Urethra disorders
Male genital disorders